Michel Régnier (5 May 1931 – 29 October 1999), best known by his pseudonym Greg, was a Belgian cartoonist best known for Achille Talon, and later became editor of Tintin magazine.

Biography
Regnier was born in Ixelles, Belgium in 1931. His first series, Les Aventures de Nestor et Boniface, appeared in the Belgian magazine Vers l'Avenir when he was sixteen.  He moved to the comic magazine Héroic Albums, going on to work for the Franco-Belgian comics magazine Spirou in 1954. In 1955 he launched his own magazine, Paddy, but eventually discontinued it.

The series for which Greg is best known, Achille Talon, began in 1963 in Pilote magazine, also the source of comics such as Asterix. This series, which he both wrote and illustrated, presents the comic misadventures of the eponymous mild-mannered polysyllabic bourgeois. In all 42 albums appeared, the first years with short gags, later with full-length (i.e. 44 pages) stories. The series was continued by Widenlocher after the death of Greg. An English translation titled Walter Melon was unsuccessful. In 1996, an animated series of 52 episodes of 26 minutes each was produced. This series was also shown in English as Walter Melon. Other series Greg provided artwork for in the early 60s were the boxing series Rock Derby and the revival of Alain Saint-Ogan's classic series Zig et Puce.

Regnier became editor-in-chief of Tintin magazine in 1966 and remained so until 1974. In this period, he moved the magazine away from the classic Ligne claire of Hergé and Edgar Pierre Jacobs, because the main authors published new stories less frequently, and because the magazine suffered from the success of new French magazines like Pilote. Greg introduced a more adult genre, with less perfect heroes and more violence. He created some of his most famous series like Bruno Brazil and Bernard Prince in this period, and introduced artists like Hermann to the magazine.

In 1975 he became literary director for the French publisher Dargaud and launched Achille Talon magazine. Having moved to Paris, he became a French citizen, and officially took a new name, Michel Greg. In the late 1970s he moved to the U.S. as a representative for Dargaud, working on several television projects and promoting European comics. He returned to France in the mid-1980s where he continued scripting comics and also wrote novels for the Hardy et Lesage collection of Fleuve Noir.

As "Greg", Regnier was one of the most prolific creators of Franco-Belgian comics, working in all genres and collaborating with many other European artists and scriptwriters. Well known for working with artist Hermann, Greg also worked with André Franquin, Eddy Paape (Luc Orient), Dany, Albert Uderzo and René Goscinny, and many others. It is estimated that he contributed as a writer and an artist to some 250 comic albums.

Hergé asked him to remake two of The Adventures of Tintin – The Seven Crystal Balls and Prisoners of the Sun – into a script for one long animated movie, Tintin and the Temple of the Sun. He also wrote the script for Tintin and the Lake of Sharks. Greg was asked to write two stories for the Tintin comics as well, including Le Thermozéro, but in the end Hergé, wanting to keep all creative control, did not use them.

Michel Regnier died in 1999 in Paris, France.

Bibliography
Only those series for which albums have appeared are mentioned here. Furthermore, Greg has made many series in the 1950s, especially in La Libre Belgique, of which no albums have appeared. Titles are ordered by the first year in which an album appeared, not the first year the comic appeared in a magazine or newspaper.

Awards
 1985: Haxtur Award, Spain, Best Long Comic Strip for Spirou et Fantasio: QRN sur Bretzelburg, artist: André Franquin

Sources

  
 Greg publications in Spirou, Belgian Tintin, French Tintin, Vaillant and Pif and Pilote BDoubliées 

Footnotes

External links
Greg biography  on Dupuis
Greg biography on Lambiek Comiclopedia

1931 births
1999 deaths
People from Ixelles
Belgian comics writers
Belgian comics artists
Belgian humorists
French comics writers
French comics artists
Belgian editors
French editors
Belgian magazine editors
French magazine editors
Belgian expatriates in France
Naturalized citizens of France
Burials at Père Lachaise Cemetery
French male writers
Tintin